The 9th Pan American Games were held in Caracas, Venezuela  from August 14 to August 29, 1983.

Medals

Gold

Men's Marathon: Jorge González

Men's Light Flyweight (– 48 kg): Rafael Ramos

Silver

Men's Marathon: César Mercado
Men's 3000 m Steeplechase: Carmelo Ríos

Men's 100m Freestyle: Fernando Cañales

Men's Featherweight (– 57 kg): Santos Cardona
Men's Middleweight (– 75 kg): Alfredo Delgado

Women's Singles: Gigi Fernández
Women's Doubles: Gigi Fernández and Marilda Julia

Bronze

Men's Javelin: Amado Morales

Men's Flyweight (– 51 kg): Héctor Ortíz

Men's Open Class: José O. Fuentes

Men's – 56 kg: Porfirio de Léon

Men's Greco-Roman – 68 kg: José Betancourt
Men's Freestyle – 57 kg: Orlando Cáceres

Results by event

See also

Puerto Rico at the 1982 Central American and Caribbean Games
Puerto Rico at the 1984 Summer Olympics

References

Nations at the 1983 Pan American Games
1983 in Puerto Rican sports
1983